Rinella may refer to:

Steven Rinella
Fort Rinella